Matt Munro (born 5 February 1971) is an Australian former professional rugby league footballer who played in the 1990s, and has coached in the 1990s.

Playing career
Munro began his first grade career with the Parramatta Eels in Round 8 of the 1990 season against the Illawarra Steelers in a 16–12 victory. Munro then switched to Balmain Tigers in 1992 and played with the club until the end of 1995 during which time the club was re-branded as the Sydney Tigers for one season and played out of the Parramatta Stadium at the start of the Super League war. In 1998, Munro transferred to the South Sydney Rabbitohs and played one season with the club before retiring.

References

1971 births
Living people
Australian rugby league coaches
Australian rugby league players
Balmain Tigers players
Oldham R.L.F.C. coaches
Oldham R.L.F.C. players
Parramatta Eels players
Rugby league locks
Rugby league players from Sydney
South Sydney Rabbitohs players